Follow My Lead may refer to:

Follow My Lead (band)
"Follow My Lead", song by 50 Cent from Curtis
"Follow My Lead", song by rappers Brotha Lynch Hung and C-Bo from Blocc Movement
"Follow My Lead", song by Justin Timberlake and Esmée Denters